Hafiz Mumtaz Ahmed is a Pakistani politician who is the current Provincial Minister of Punjab for excise, taxation and narcotics control, in office from 27 August 2018 till 10 April 2022. He had been a member of the Provincial Assembly of the Punjab from August 2018 till January 2023. He is the son of Chaudhry Mukhtar Ahmed Gujjar who is a notable business personality of Faisalabad.

Political career
He was elected to the Provincial Assembly of the Punjab as a candidate of Pakistan Tehreek-e-Insaf from Constituency PP-105 (Faisalabad-IX) in 2018 Pakistani general election.

On 27 August 2018, he was inducted into the provincial Punjab cabinet of Chief Minister Sardar Usman Buzdar and was appointed as Provincial Minister of Punjab for excise, taxation and narcotics control.

References

Living people
Pakistan Tehreek-e-Insaf MPAs (Punjab)
Provincial ministers of Punjab
Year of birth missing (living people)